The 1917 Harvard Crimson football team, also known as the Harvard Informals, represented Harvard University in the 1917 college football season. The Crimson finished with a 3–1–3 record under first-year head coach Wingate Rollins.  Walter Camp did not select any Harvard players as first-team members of his 1917 College Football All-America Team.

The team was known as the "Informals" for legal reasons. Prior to the United States' entry into World War I, the team had signed binding contracts to play games with various universities and colleges.  When war was declared, the team cancelled its season and cancelled the contracts. When students decide to play football after all, the team was denoted as an "informal" team to fulfill the desire for football without opening the team up to suits for breach of contract.

Schedule

References

Harvard
Harvard Crimson football seasons
Harvard Crimson football
1910s in Boston